Elaine Regina Taylor Plummer (born 17 October 1943) is an English former actress, best known as a leading lady in comedy films of the late 1960s and early 1970s. She is the widow of Canadian actor Christopher Plummer, to whom she was married for 50 years.

Early life
Elaine Regina Taylor was born in Hemel Hempstead, Hertfordshire. With the encouragement of her mother, Frances, she took dancing lessons as a child. In 1950, had her hair styled by hairdresser Raymond Bessone for the part of Will O'the Wisp. Taylor later studied at the Italia Conti Academy of Theatre Arts and joined the London Festival Ballet.

Career

Early television and radio roles
In the mid-1960s, Taylor appeared in episodes of British television series such as The Benny Hill Show (1965), The Lance Percival Show (1966), in which she sang as well as taking part in comedy sketches, The Old Campaigner (1967), which featured Terry-Thomas as a womanising plastics salesman, and Mr Rose, starring William Mervyn as a retired senior policeman (1968). Her appearance with Benny Hill on 18 December 1965 included a gender-reversal parody of the 1956 film Baby Doll that Hill repeated in 1974 with Diana Darvey. Taylor is thought also to have been the announcer of a sketch in which Hill first performed his song "Those Days" in imitation of Sonny and Cher. She worked again with Hill in the third series of his BBC radio show Benny Hill Time, which started on the Light Programme on 27 February 1966 and featured, among others, Patricia Hayes and Peter Vernon.

Transition to film
Taylor was a "Bond girl" (with, among others, Jacqueline Bisset, Barbara Bouchet and Alexandra Bastedo) as Peg in Casino Royale (1967) and played on stage with Tommy Steele in Half a Sixpence and in the 1967 film version. She was cast in the role of the "mod" Victoria Ponsonby in the comedy film Diamonds for Breakfast (1968), considered by Leslie Halliwell to be a "yawning comedy caper yarn embellished with sex and slapstick", that also featured Marcello Mastroianni, in his first English language film, and Rita Tushingham. Around the same time, Taylor played Shirley Blair, pregnant fiancée of Tom Taggart (Christian Roberts), in Hammer's adaptation of Bill MacIlwraith's play The Anniversary (also 1968), a "high camp" black comedy starring Bette Davis and Sheila Hancock. Tom Chantrell's famous poster for The Anniversary featured a front-on still of Taylor in brassiere and panties below the slogan (attributed to Davies' character) "I Spy with my little eye/Something beginning with SEX … and I mean to put a stop to it".

Later career
Following her appearance as Cloris in the film Lock Up Your Daughters (1969), Taylor appeared in two more films, Michael Winner's The Games and the Warren Mitchell comedy All the Way Up (both 1970). She also starred in an episode of ITC's Jason King ("A Royal Flush", 1972) and The Organization (also 1972) in which she appeared in all seven episodes as secretary Veronica. This was produced by Yorkshire Television and written by Philip Mackie. She was cast in television dramas for the BBC, including Trelawny of the Wells (as Rose Trelawny, 1972) and Kingsley Amis' Doctor Watson and the Darkwater Hall Mystery (as Emily, Lady Fairfax alongside Edward Fox's Dr. Watson, 1974). In the mid-1980s she returned to television in America in The George McKenna Story (1986) and Sharing Richard (1988), and co-produced the 1987 film Love Potion. Taylor's last known appearance was in California-set true-crime television film Till Death Us Do Part (1992).

Personal life
In 1969, Taylor met Christopher Plummer, best known at the time for his role as Captain von Trapp in The Sound of Music (1965), while they were both filming Lock Up Your Daughters in Kilkenny, Ireland. Plummer was almost 14 years older, twice divorced, and had recently been partnering Richard Harris' ex-wife Elizabeth Rees-Williams. Taylor's usually "mousy" hair, which was tinted red on location, is said to have appealed to Plummer. For her part, Taylor agreed to meet him again in London provided that he reduced his consumption of alcohol.

Taylor and Plummer were married in Montreal, Quebec on 2 October 1970. The officiant, the Reverend Philip Moreton, had married Richard Burton and Elizabeth Taylor in 1964. The two remained married for over 50 years, until Plummer's death in February 2021.

In the 1970s, Plummer and Taylor moved to a rambling English style estate at Weston, Connecticut. Taylor has no children of her own; her stepdaughter is the actress Amanda Plummer (born 1957), Plummer's daughter from his first marriage to Tammy Grimes. A few months after their marriage, Alan Bennett remarked wryly to Kenneth Tynan that Plummer was "his own worst enemy—but only just," while Plummer's own autobiography almost forty years later was entitled In Spite of Myself.

In 2012, Plummer identified "the key to lasting marriage" as "stay[ing] out of each other's hair" and reflected that while he and Taylor quarrelled a lot, they "always end up in laughter which saves the day". More generally, he described Taylor's positive influence on his life:
a combination of Edith Cavell and Julia Child ... a nurse and a cook. I feel guilty sometimes that I denied her a wonderful life, that she's wasted it on some terrible old ham. She could have married a duke or a prince! And she knows it. But being British, you see, she never complains. She's very well trained.

Other interests
Taylor is a gourmet French cook and she and Plummer renovated or designed houses in West Hollywood, Grasse and London before settling in Weston.

References

External links

 
 Poster for The Anniversary (Tom Chantrell, 1968)
  Elaine Taylor (front right) in The Anniversary.
  Elaine Taylor (with Christian Roberts) in The Anniversary
  Elaine Taylor and Christopher Plummer at Academy Awards, 2010

1943 births
Living people
English film actresses
English television actresses
People from Hemel Hempstead
Actresses from Hertfordshire
Alumni of the Italia Conti Academy of Theatre Arts
20th-century English actresses
People from Weston, Connecticut
English expatriates in the United States